Blair Precinct was a district of Randolph County, Illinois, USA.  As of the 2000 census, its population was 290. As of the 2010 census, it had been split between Central Precinct and Palestine Precinct.

Geography

References

Precincts in Randolph County, Illinois